Criminal Minds is a 2005 American police procedural crime drama television series.

Criminal Minds may also refer to:

Film and television

Criminal Minds (franchise),  media franchise of American television programs created by Jeff Davis
Criminal Minds (video game), 2012 video game
Criminal Minds: Suspect Behavior, 2011 American television series
Criminal Minds: Beyond Borders, 2016 American television series
Criminal Minds (South Korean TV series), a 2017 South Korean television series

Music
The Criminal Minds, a UK hip-hop group

See also
Criminal Mind (disambiguation)